Ferrum is a census-designated place (CDP) in Franklin County, Virginia, United States. The population was 2,043 at the 2010 census, an increase of over fifty percent from the 1,313 reported in 2000. Ferrum is home to Ferrum College and its Blue Ridge Folklife Festival. It is part of the Roanoke Metropolitan Statistical Area.

Geography
Ferrum is located at  (36.926381, −80.011181).
According to the United States Census Bureau, the CDP has a total area of 9.2 square miles (24.0 km²), all of it land.

Demographics
At the 2000 census there were 1,313 people, 285 households, and 169 families in the CDP. The population density was 141.9 people per square mile (54.8/km²). There were 307 housing units at an average density of 33.2/sq mi (12.8/km²).  The racial makeup of the CDP was 80.81% White, 16.22% African American, 0.23% Native American, 0.69% Asian, 0.91% from other races, and 1.14% from two or more races. Hispanic or Latino of any race were 1.68%.

Of the 285 households 32.6% had children under the age of 18 living with them, 48.8% were married couples living together, 6.7% had a female householder with no husband present, and 40.4% were non-families. 33.0% of households were one person and 7.7% were one person aged 65 or older. The average household size was 2.38 and the average family size was 3.07.

The age distribution was 13.6% under the age of 18, 53.4% from 18 to 24, 17.2% from 25 to 44, 11.2% from 45 to 64, and 4.6% 65 or older. The median age was 21 years. For every 100 females there were 122.2 males. For every 100 females age 18 and over, there were 131.0 males.

The median household income was $35,208 and the median family income  was $46,818. Males had a median income of $27,938 versus $22,917 for females. The per capita income for the CDP was $12,276. About 4.0% of families and 9.7% of the population were below the poverty line, including none of those under the age of eighteen or sixty-five or over.

Point of interest
Ferrum is home to Ferrum College, a small college of approximately 1,500 students.

References

Census-designated places in Franklin County, Virginia